Jarikaba Airstrip  is an airstrip serving the town of Jarikaba in Suriname. Jarikaba is a western suburb of Paramaribo.

See also

 List of airports in Suriname
 Transport in Suriname

References

External links
OpenStreetMap - Jarikaba

Airports in Suriname
Brokopondo District